The 1959 Colorado Buffaloes football team was an American football team that represented the University of Colorado in the Big Seven Conference during the 1959 NCAA University Division football season. Led by first-year head coach Sonny Grandelius, the Buffaloes compiled an overall record of 5–5 with a mark of 3–3 in conference play, tying for third place in the Big 7. The team played its home games on campus at Folsom Field in Boulder, Colorado.

Previously an assistant for five years at his alma mater, Michigan State University, under Duffy Daugherty, the 29-year-old Grandelius was hired as the Buffs' head coach in February, succeeding Dallas Ward. He signed a four-year contract at $14,000 per year.

Schedule

Coaching staff
 Bob Ghilotti (ends)
 Chuck Boerio (LB)
 Buck Nystrom (line) 
 John Polonchek (backs)

References

External links
 Sports-Reference – 1959 Colorado Buffaloes

Colorado
Colorado Buffaloes football seasons
Colorado Buffaloes football